Laura Margaret Busson (née Sayers; 11 October 1978) is BBC Radio 2's Commissioning Executive and deputy to the Head of Station, Helen Thomas. She was well known for her former role as sidekick and Assistant Producer for Scott Mills on BBC Radio 1. She later became the producer for Greg James, before leaving to join Heart Yorkshire as Programme Controller.

Background
Originally from York, England, where she was educated at The Mount School, York, Sayers later moved to Glasgow where she studied for 4 years achieving an MA hons in Theatre and English Language. This is where she had her first experiences in radio at student station Subcity Radio.

Radio 1 
Laura started at Radio 1 by applying for a BBC Talent production traineeship with Jocelin Stainer from The Chris Moyles Show, near the end of the traineeship she started working on the Scott Mills show.

She is well known for public stunts which have involved trying to get an ASBO, as well as becoming Radio 1's unofficial vigilante against non permit holders parking in disabled parking spaces or people who do not clean up after their dogs. Laura also appeared on CNN after filming a comical audition to become P Diddy's personal assistant where she dances for him and says, "I loved your work at the Diana concert, you were a-maz-in, you touched me so much and if i'm your PA you can touch me when ever you want, all the time."

As well as being an assistant, Laura occasionally produced shows for Scott Mills, JK and Joel and Sara Cox. At the end of March 2008, Laura was promoted to a new position within Radio 1 as producer of Fearne Cotton and Reggie Yates' weekend shows, which includes the official chart show. For a time she was the assistant producer of the Nick Grimshaw show, Monday – Thursdays 10pm-midnight. She produced Huw Stephens' two Wednesday night shows and subsequently replaced producer Neil as Greg James' producer.

Laura's Diary 
During October 2005, when the team were temporarily presenting The Chris Moyles Show, Laura's sister Mary Sayers (now Jones) who had found Laura's teenage diaries in her bedroom at her family house in York, was asked to read the diaries out on air.

The team decided to carry this feature on again when they next covered for Moyles during January 2006 and began Season 2, entitled "The College Years". This season consisted of many weird and rude codes, and the revelation of her love of her piano teacher in 1996.

'Laura's Diary' became such a hit with Scott's listeners, it was moved to the afternoon show. Season 3 saw Laura meet Ben from her brother's band Monster Sunshine. They tried for a relationship but subsequently she moved to Glasgow for university.

In Season 4, Laura talks of troubles at university and the woes of attempting to have a long-distance relationship with Ben. The season ends with Ben dumping Laura by letter.

Mills joked a couple of times during the readings that because Laura was "unlucky in love" he would make it his mission to help her. This led to the hit Radio 1 tour 'One Night With Laura' – an 'X Factor' style tour of the UK auditioning suitable boyfriends for Sayers.

One Night With Laura
Potential partners were asked to fill in a form on BBC Radio 1's website and, because of the success, in the last week of March 2006 a tour known as 'One Night with Laura' took place in Southampton, Cardiff, Nottingham, Newcastle and Glasgow. The contestants had to impress Laura, and a panel of judges, enough for those to decide that they were right for her. This included many strange occurrences such as a contestant lying on a bed of nails and asking Sayers to stand on his back.

On the judging panel was Scott, Laura, her father Stephen and Mark "Chappers" Chapman. On the last two nights Chapman, who had other commitments, was replaced by Laura's sister, Mary Sayers, and Jo Whiley. The auditionees came and went and were whittled down to just four partners from each of the auditions in Southampton, Cardiff, Nottingham and Newcastle (nobody qualified from Glasgow). These were Ben, James, Gareth and Shep. James was the first person to be voted out by the public.

Each of the final three were paraded on Radio 1 over a week of breakfast shows, participating in tasks and taking part in interviews to try to win over their all important votes. The final took place on 2006-04-07 and saw Gareth from Chard win the public vote.

Even though he won the overall competition, after he and Laura spent a weekend in Paris together, it was clear Sayers believed him more of a friend than a boyfriend. She later began dating one of the original contestants (whom she eventually married), James Busson from Chichester. She'd earlier voiced her disappointment that James did not make it to the final.

Laura's Diary – The Book 
Because of the success of the diary on Radio 1, Laura's Diary was released to the public as a book on Thursday 30 November 2006. It included entries not heard during the radio broadcasts.

Heart Radio 
In July 2015 Laura left BBC Radio 1 to work for Heart Yorkshire as Programme Controller. Under her leadership the station clocked up their highest ever listening figures according to RAJAR in August 2017. This was not only the highest figures for the station but also the highest reach ever recorded on the license.

Radio 2 
In August 2020 Laura rejoined the BBC as BBC Radio 2's Commissioning Executive and deputy to the Head of Station, Helen Thomas.

References

External links
 Laura's "mini-site" at bbc.co.uk
 Unofficial Laura
 Laura's Diary on Amazon
  Nick Grimshaw Mini-Site
  Scott Mills Mini-Site
  The Official Chart Show Website
  Reggie Yates' Request Show

1978 births
Living people
BBC Radio 1
People from York
People educated at The Mount School, York